[[File:Frank C. Papé JURGEN "Upon the Middle Chest sat a woman.".jpg|thumb|From Jurgen, A Comedy of Justice (1921)]]
Frank Cheyne Papé, who generally signed himself Frank C. Papé (4 July 1878 – 5 May 1972), was an English artist and book illustrator. He studied at The Slade School of Fine Art, completing his studies –04. Papé was married to a fellow Slade student, illustrator Agnes Stringer.

Works
Papé's first known work, for Emile Clement's Naughty Eric and Other Stories from Giant, Witch, and Fairyland, published in 1902, remains extremely rare. One copy is held by The British Library. An original pen and ink illustration from one of the stories, 'The Magic Stone', has been found in Sussex, England.

Papé's next earliest illustrations are found in books for children from around 1908, including The Toils and Travels of Odysseus (1908), a translation of The Odyssey by C.A. Pease; and Bunyan's The Pilgrim's Progress (1910). During the second decade of the 20th century, he made extensive contributions to the a number of collections of fairy, folk and other children's tales, as well as illustrating a collection of the Psalms.

By 1911, Papé was a highly successful book illustrator. World War I brought a decline in Britain's illustrated book market, affecting Papé's livelihood. He enlisted in the Royal Army Service Corps in 1915 and served on the Greco-Bulgarian front.

Papé's career was revived in the early 1920s through his illustrations for a number of books by James Branch Cabell, which brought him new acclaim in the United States. These books from Biography of the Life of Manuel series issued by the London publishing house The Bodley Head, included Jurgen, A Comedy of Justice (1921, originally in a limited edition), The High Place, Something about Eve and The Cream of the Jest. These illustrations often wittily paralleled the double entendres in Cabell's writing. In the preface to the 1925 edition of his book Figures of Earth, Cabell praised the fitness of Papé's style for these works.

The success of these editions led to Bodley Head commissioning illustrations by Papé for books of Anatole France,  including The Revolt of the Angels (1924) and Penguin Island (1925), in addition to those for the works of Rabelais. He also designed book covers for other authors, including Rafael Sabatini (The Life of Cesare Borgia, 1924).

Circa 1925, Papé began to provide illustrations for Uncle Ray's Corner, a weekly children's column by Wisconsin writer Ramon Coffman that was syndicated in the United States by the Cleveland Plain Dealer. This collaboration, which lasted for several decades, led to a number of book illustration commissions, including Uncle Ray's Story of the Stone-Age People (1936) and The Child's Story of Science (1939).

Papé was also sought after as a designer of bookplates, including one for Dennis Wheatley. He also illustrated Wheatley's 1933 biography of Charles II, Old Rowley, and created dust jacket illustrations  for the first editions of several Wheatley novels, including The Devil Rides Out (1935), Strange Conflict (1941), The Haunting of Toby Jugg (1948), and To the Devil a Daughter (1953).

During the late 1930s, Papé's career faltered. Starting in 1945, he continued his collaboration with Ramon Coffman when Coffman launched Uncle Ray's Magazine; Papé contributed to this publication until the mid-1950s, first as art director, then as a staff artist. By the end of the 1950s, his eyesight was in serious decline, and his only known work in the 1960s was a series of children's books for Oxford University Press. His last published work was a 1968 reprint of a 1933 illustrated version of Robinson Crusoe.

As Illustrator

Publication dates refer to version illustrated by Pape.

 
 
 
 
 
 
 
 
 
 
 
 
 
 
  
 
 
 

For works  by James Branch Cabell

For works by Anatole France

, 2 vol.s, trans.  Sir Thomas Urquhart and Peter Motteuxalso , trans. John M. Cohen

, by Rhys Davies, Furnival Books No. 4.

From 1935 onwards Pape illustrated for the children's newspaper column Uncle Ray's Corner''.

Legacy
A number of Papé's original drawings, together with some of his correspondence, is preserved at Stanford University.

References

Sources

Further reading

External links

 

 
 

1878 births
1972 deaths
People from Camberwell
English illustrators
British children's book illustrators
Fantasy artists
20th-century illustrators of fairy tales
British Army personnel of World War I
Royal Army Service Corps soldiers